Old Homestead may refer to:

 The Old Homestead, an 1886 play by Denman Thompson
 The Old Homestead (1915 film), based on the play
 The Old Homestead (1922 film), based on the play
 The Old Homestead (1935 film), based on the play
 The Old Homestead (1942 film), an American comedy film
 The Old Homestead, an 1855 novel by Ann S. Stephens adapted for the stage by George Aiken
 Old Homestead Records, a country and bluegrass music record label
 Old Homestead Steakhouse, the oldest continuously operating steakhouse in the United States

Named places

Australia 
 Old Homestead Cave, a cave on the Nullarbor Plain in Western Australia

United States 
(by state)
 Old Homestead, Southgate, Michigan
 Old Homestead (Aberdeen, Mississippi), listed on the NRHP in Mississippi
 Wood Old Homestead, Rio Grande, Ohio, listed on the NRHP in Ohio
 Old Homestead (Enon Valley, Pennsylvania), listed on the NRHP in Pennsylvania
 Harner Homestead, near Morgantown, West Virginia, also known as the Old Harner Homestead

See also 
 Old (disambiguation)
 Homestead (disambiguation)